Michael Sharvell-Martin (2 February 1944 – 28 October 2010) was a popular British television and stage actor whose career spanned more than three decades. He was a familiar character actor on British television screens, guest-starring in several prime time dramas and comedies during the 1970s and 1980s.

Early life
Sharvell-Martin was born Michael Ernest Martin in Herne Bay, Kent, and  trained in stage management at the Bristol Old Vic Theatre School. His acting debut was in 1965 at the Everyman Theatre, Cheltenham. He adopted the stage name Michael Sharvell-Martin because there was already an actor called Michael Martin.

Career
Sharvell-Martin was mainly a supporting cast actor and is best remembered for his many appearances in the long-running television series Dave Allen at Large. He also had a recurring role as Trevor Botting in the television situation comedy No Place Like Home. During his career he made numerous guest appearances in television programmes such as The Benny Hill Show, Dad's Army, Terry and June, Yes Minister and Murder Most Horrid. He also appeared in two episodes of the BBC's department store sitcom Are You Being Served? in the 1980s.

His stage appearances included several West End comedy farces and numerous pantomime roles regularly as the dame at the Theatre Royal Windsor .

Selected filmography
 Quest for Love (1971) - Says "Hello Trafford" (uncredited)
 That's Your Funeral (1972) - 1st Policeman (Motorway)
 Ooh... You Are Awful (1972) - Jackson (uncredited)
 Go for a Take (1972) - Leopard Man' Director
 Rentadick (1972) - Removal Man
 Kadoyng (1972) - Pander - Willoughby
 The Love Ban (1973) - Bra Factory Designer
 Love Thy Neighbour (1973) - Police Constable
 The Best of Benny Hill (1974) - Lower Tidmarsh Hospital Doctor / Rev. Peter Wilby / Various
 Frightmare (1974) - Barman
 Not Now, Comrade (1976) - 2nd Russian Official
 No Place Like Home (1983-1988) - Trevor Botting

Personal life
Sharvell-Martin  married Linda Hind in 1967 and the couple had two daughters. In the early part of 2010 he was diagnosed with cancer of the oesophagus and died on 28 October 2010 at Wincanton, Somerset.

References

External links
 

1944 births
2010 deaths
English male television actors
English male stage actors
People from Herne Bay, Kent
Deaths from cancer in England
Deaths from esophageal cancer
Male actors from Kent